Morley bus station is a Transperth bus station located next to the Galleria Shopping Centre in Morley, Western Australia. It has 12 stands and is served by 20 Transperth routes operated by Path Transit, Swan Transit and Transdev WA.

History
The original Morley bus station opened in August 1972 as the first bus station in the Perth metropolitan area.

The current Morley bus station was opened on 1 July 1994 by Stephen Smith, the federal member for Perth. The ceremony was also attended by Eric Charlton, the state government's Minister for Transport.

While there has never been a Park and ride facility at the Morley bus station, bus passengers would generally use an adjacent carpark at the Galleria Shopping Centre. However, the Galleria Shopping Centre has been chaining off this carpark, leaving passengers with no parking at one of the busiest bus stations in Perth.

Bus routes

Platform A

Platform B

Platform C

Russell Street

References

External links
Access map Transperth

Bus stations in Perth, Western Australia
Morley, Western Australia